"Snow-White and Rose-Red" is a German fairy tale. The best-known version is the one collected by the Brothers Grimm (KHM 161). An older, somewhat shorter version, "The Ungrateful Dwarf", was written by Caroline Stahl (1776–1837). Indeed, that appears to be the oldest variant; no previous oral version is known, although several have been collected since its publication in 1818. Oral versions are very limited regionally. The tale is of Aarne-Thompson type 426 ("The Two Girls, the Bear, and the Dwarf").

This story is not related to the Brothers Grimm fairy tale "Snow White" that provided the basis for the 1937 Walt Disney animated film Snow White and the Seven Dwarfs. The modern German name of that heroine is Schneewittchen rather than Schneeweißchen. This story has little in common but the similar name of its fair-skinned girl. "Snow-White and Rose-Red" does feature encounters with one dwarf.

Plot
Snow-White and Rose-Red are two little girls living with their mother, a poor widow, in a small cottage by the woods. Snow-White is quiet and shy and prefers to spend her time indoors, doing housework and reading. Rose-Red is outspoken, lively and cheerful, and prefers to be outside. They are both very good girls who love each other and their mother dearly, and their mother is very fond of them as well.

One winter night, there is a knock at the door. Rose-Red opens the door to find a bear. At first, she is terrified, but the bear tells her not to be afraid. "I'm half frozen and I merely want to warm up a little at your place," he says. They let the bear in, and he lies down in front of the fire. Snow-White and Rose-Red beat the snow off the bear, and they quickly become quite friendly with him. They play with the bear and roll him around playfully. They let the bear spend the night in front of the fire. In the morning, he leaves trotting out into the woods. The bear comes back every night for the rest of that winter and the family grows used to him.

When summer comes, the bear tells them that he must go away for a while to guard his treasure from a wicked dwarf. During the summer, when the girls are walking through the forest, they find a dwarf whose beard is stuck in a tree. The girls rescue him by cutting his beard free, but the dwarf is ungrateful and yells at them for cutting his beautiful beard. The girls encounter the dwarf several times that summer and rescue him from some peril each time, for which he is ungrateful.

Then one day, they meet the dwarf once again. This time, he is terrified because the bear is about to kill him. The dwarf pleads with the bear and begs it to eat the girls. Instead, the bear pays no heed to his plea and kills the dwarf with one swipe of his paw. Instantly, the bear turns into a prince. The dwarf had previously put a spell on the prince by stealing his precious stones and turning him into a bear. The curse is broken with the death of the dwarf. Snow-White marries the prince and Rose-Red marries the prince's brother.

Other versions
 "Schneeweißchen und Rosenrot" by the Brothers Grimm (German language)
 "Snow-White and Rose-Red"; May Sellar, transl., Andrew Lang, ed., The Blue Fairy Book, 1889
 Snow-White and Rose-Red and the Big Black Bear, by Clifton Johnson (1913)
 "Rose White and Rose Red", storybook and cassette in Fabbri's Once Upon a Time series (audio)
 "Snow-White and Rose-Red"; Margaret Hunt, transl., Grimm's Household Tales, Vol. 2, No. 161
 "Snow-White and Rose-Red" by Edith Wyatt – short story
Snow White and Rose Red by Patricia C. Wrede, in the Fairy Tale Series created by Terri Windling – 1989 fantasy novel based on the tale and set in medieval England
 The Shadow of the Bear by Regina Doman – 1997 novel based on the tale and set in contemporary New York City.
 Tender Morsels by Margo Lanagan – 2008 fantasy novel based on the tale 
 Snow & Rose by Emily Winfield Martin, Random House, October 10, 2017

Gallery

See also
 Cupid and Psyche
 Beauty and the Beast
 Graciosa and Percinet
 East of the Sun and West of the Moon

References

 Grimm, Jacob and William, edited and translated by Stanley Appelbaum, Selected Folktales/Ausgewählte Märchen : A Dual-Language Book Dover Publications Inc. Mineola, New York. 
 Andrew Lang's "Blue Fairy Tale Book"

Further reading

External links

 

Grimms' Fairy Tales
Fiction about shapeshifting
German fairy tales
Female characters in fairy tales
Fictional duos
ATU 400-459